Silvanoprus longicollis, is a species of silvan flat bark beetle found in India, Sri Lanka, Malaysia, Java, China, Japan, Madagascar and East Africa.

Description
Total length is about 2.17 to 2.38 mm. Body elongated, with slightly depressed form. Dorsum is yellowish to blackish brown in color. Body is covered with short, semi-erect, golden pubescence. Ocellate punctures are common on head and prothorax. Antennal scape is large and robust. The antennal joints 2-8 are markedly narrower than scape. Coarse puncturation on pronotum uniform throughout. Anterior spine is projected forward with a pointed tip. Eyes are small and coarsely faceted. Temple is long. Prothorax convex, and elongated. Scutellum moderately large and transverse. Elytra is very long and broad with wavy side margins and slightly explanate.

References 

Silvanidae
Insects of Sri Lanka
Insects of India
Insects described in 1876